Shitole is a Maratha clan found largely in Maharashtra, Karnataka and nearby regions of India.

History
Under the Sultanates of Deccan during the pre-Shivaji era, Shitoles were administrators of more than three hundred villages near Pune. They were the Maratha's revenue collecting agents in Maratha history.

Branches 
The Shitoles served Kolhapur Princely State of Chhatrapatis through Sardar Sultanji Shitole, Sardar Appajirao Shitole, Sardar khetroji Shitole, Sardar Mahadaji Shitole Sardar Naroji Shitole Sardar Baji Shitole and Sardar Tukoji Shitole.

References

Sources 

 

Maratha clans